The Tenth Amendment Center is an American political organisation.

Organization 
The Tenth Amendment Center was founded in 2007 by Michael Boldin, its Executive Director.

Activities 
The Tenth Amendment Center lobbies against US federal legislation that it considers to be at odds with the Constitution of the United States. It has been described by the Southern Poverty Law Center as politically far right.

In 2016, in what was described as an "unusual partnership" in Education Week, the Tenth Amendment Center partnered with the American Civil Liberties Union to propose suggested legislation to protect student data privacy.

References

External links 

 Official website

2007 establishments in California
Far-right organizations in the United States
Libertarian organizations based in the United States
Organizations based in California